Taras Volodymyrovych Horilyi (born 28 April 2001) is a Ukrainian professional footballer who plays as a centre-back for Dnipro-1.

Career
In summer 2022 he moved to Epitsentr Dunaivtsi. In February 2023 his contract with the club expired.

Personal life
His father Volodymyr Horilyi is also a former footballer, who played for Tavriya Simferopol, Dynamo Kyiv, Zenit Saint Petersburg, Dnipro Dnipropetrovsk, and Ukraine national football team, and currently is a football manager.

References

External links
 
 

2001 births
Living people
Footballers from Dnipro
Ukrainian footballers
Association football defenders
FC Dnipro players
SC Dnipro-1 players
FC Nikopol players
Ukrainian Second League players
Ukrainian Amateur Football Championship players